The 1957–58 DFB-Pokal was the 15th season of the annual German football cup competition. It began on 25 June 1958 and ended on 16 November 1958. 4 teams competed in the tournament of two rounds. In the final VfB Stuttgart defeated Fortuna Düsseldorf 4–3 after extra time.

Matches

Qualification round

Replay

Semi-finals

Final

References

External links
 Official site of the DFB 
 Kicker.de 
 1958 results at Fussballdaten.de 

1957-58
1957–58 in German football cups